Roma quadrata (Latin, "Square Rome") was an area, or perhaps a structure, within the original pomerium of the ancient city of Rome, probably the Palatine Hill with its Palatium and Cermalus peaks and its slopes. 

It apparently dated to the earliest stage of the city's formation.  The original meaning had already become obscure to both Latin and Greek historians by the late Roman Republic (2nd century BC).

Primary sources
 Varro ap. Solin. 1.17
 Plut. Rom. 9
 Dion. Hal. Ant. Rom. 2.65
 Tac. Ann. 12.24

Further reading
 Brocato, P. "Dalle capanne del Cermalus alla Roma quadrata." Roma Romolo Remo e la fondazione della città (Catalog of the Exhibit) (2000): 284-287.
 Carandini, Andrea. Remo e Romolo: dai rioni dei Quiriti alla città dei Romani (775/750-700/675 a. C.). Vol. 210. Einaudi, 2006.
 Carandini, Andrea, "The Blessing of the Palatine and the Founding of Roma Quadrata," in Idem, Rome: Day One (Princeton, Princeton University Press, 2011), 50-62.
 Castagnoli, F. "Roma Quadrata, in, Studies presented to DM Robinson", I, St." (1951): 389-399.
 Castagnoli, Ferdinando. "Il Tempio Romano: Questioni di Terminologia e di Tipologia." Papers of the British School at Rome (1984): 3-20.
 Musti, Domenico. "Varrone nell'insieme delle tradizioni su Roma quadrata,«." StudUrb 49 (1975): 297-318.
 Quercioli, Mauro. Le mura e le porte di Roma : dalla Roma quadrata alle mura aureliane, dalla città leonina alle moderne fortificazioni: un singolare itinerario storico tra imponenti porte e possenti bastioni alla riscoperta delle "difese" di Roma  Newton Compton, 1982.
 * Rykwert, Joseph, The Idea of a Town: The Anthropology of Urban Form in Rome, Italy and the Ancient World (MIT Press, 1976, 1988), limited preview

Topography of the ancient city of Rome
Palatine Hill